Cochem is the seat of and the biggest town in the Cochem-Zell district in Rhineland-Palatinate, Germany. With just over 5,000 inhabitants, Cochem falls just behind Kusel, in the Kusel district, as Germany's second smallest district seat. Since 7 June 2009, it has belonged to the Verbandsgemeinde of Cochem.

Geography

Cochem lies at an elevation of some 83 m above sea level and the municipal area measures 21.2 km2. The town centre with the outlying centre of Sehl upstream lies on the Moselle's left bank, while the constituent centre of Cond lies on its right. Emptying into the Moselle in Cochem are the Kraklebach, the Ebernacher Bach, the Sehlerbach, the Falzbach, the Märtscheltbach and the Enthetbach.

History
As early as Celtic and Roman times, Cochem was settled. In 866, it had its first documentary mention as Villa cuchema. Other names yielded by history are Cuhckeme and Chuckeme in 893, Cochemo in 1051, Chuchumo in 1056, Kuchema in 1130, Cuchemo in 1136, Cocheme in 1144, then Cuchme, and into the 18th century Cochheim or Cocheim. Cochem was an Imperial estate. It was pledged by King Adolf of Nassau in 1294 to the Archbishopric of Trier and remained Electoral-Trier territory until the French occupation began in 1794. In 1332, Cochem was granted town rights, and shortly thereafter, the town fortifications, which still stand today, were built. Between 1423 and 1425, the town was stricken with a Plague epidemic. In 1623, Elector Lothar von Metternich brought about the founding of a Capuchin monastery. In the Thirty Years' War, the town was besieged, but not conquered. In 1689, King Louis XIV's troops first burnt the Winneburg (castle) down and then conquered the town of Cochem with its castle. Reconstruction was long and drawn out. Beginning in 1794, Cochem lay under French rule. In 1815, it was assigned to the Kingdom of Prussia at the Congress of Vienna.

Louis Fréderic Jacques Ravené bought the ruin of the former Imperial castle in 1866 and began its reconstruction. Only after a bridge was built across the Moselle at Cochem in 1927 were the two fishing villages of Cond and Sehl amalgamated with the town in the course of administrative reform in 1932. This bridge, called the "Skagerrak Bridge", was dedicated on 23 January 1927. In the Second World War, great parts of Cochem's old town  were destroyed. Also during the war, the operations staff of the underground subcamp of Zeisig of the Natzweiler concentration camp between the villages of Bruttig and Treis was located here. At its height, 13,000 people were imprisoned. They provided slave labour for Bosch, which made spark plugs, ignition systems, and glow plugs, which were important to the German war effort, under brutal conditions.

Since 1946, Cochem has been part of the then newly founded state of Rhineland-Palatinate.

Politics

Town council
The council is made up of 22 council members, who were elected at the municipal election held on 26 May 2019, and the honorary mayor as chairman.

The municipal election held on 26 May 2019 yielded the following results:

Mayor
Cochem's mayor is since 2018 Walter Schmitz, and his deputies are Josef Heimes, Wilfried Gerdes and Heinz Bremm.
 Wilhelm Schmitz, 1919–1923
 Karl Stier, 1925–1934
 Aloys Elsen, 1934–1945
 Jakob Rudolf Pauly, 1945–1949
 Ferdinand Hillebrand, 1949–1956
 Willy Massoth, (1911–1978), 1957–1969, first full-time mayor
 Anno Vey, 1969–1975
 Horst Hoffmann, 1975–1995
 Herbert Hilken, 1995–2011
 Wolfgang Lambertz, 2011–2018
 Walter Schmitz, (opted 2018)

Coat of arms
The town's arms might be described thus: Per pale argent a cross gules and gules issuant from dexter a sinister hand of the first vested sable holding two keys in saltire Or, the wards to chief.

The town of Cochem and its castle were held by the Archbishops of Trier beginning in 1298. They also granted Cochem town rights in 1332. The charges in the town's arms are thus purely references to its long history with the Electorate of Trier. The red cross on the dexter (armsbearer's right, viewer's left) side is Trier's old armorial bearing, and the keys on the sinister (armsbearer's left, viewer's right) side are Saint Peter's attribute, thus representing Trier's patron. This composition appeared in the earliest known town seal, from the early 15th century, which likely dates from a bit earlier, the late 14th century.

Town partnerships
Cochem fosters partnerships with the following places:
  Avallon, Yonne, France since 1966
  Malmedy, Liège, Belgium since 1975
  Moritzburg, Meißen, Saxony since 1990
  Yizhou District, Hechi, China since 2017

Political development
After both the town council and the Verbandsgemeinde council approved the motion on 23 October 2008, the until then Verbandsgemeinde-free town of Cochem became part of the Verbandsgemeinde of Cochem-Land on 7 June 2009. In connection with this, the state government also enacted a law on 18 February 2009 that deals with, among other things, the transfer of ownership of certain properties from the town to the Verbandsgemeinde. The Verbandsgemeinde also changed its name with the amalgamation of Cochem, becoming the Verbandsgemeinde of Cochem.

Culture and sightseeing

Buildings
The following are listed buildings or sites in Rhineland-Palatinate's Directory of Cultural Monuments:

Cochem (main centre)
 Bahnhofsvorplatz 1 – new railway station, 1900–1902; picturesquely grouped three-floor quarrystone building, Renaissance Revival, with smaller wings and additions, partly timber-frame; old railway station, 1880, quarrystone and brick building, partly timber-frame; railway lands, brick building; whole complex
 Bernstraße 2 – rectory or parish house; Baroque Revival timber-frame house, partly solid, mansard roof, about 1910
 Bernstraße 3 – timber-frame house, partly solid, mansard roof, 18th century
 Bernstraße 9 – four-floor timber-frame house, partly solid, 17th century
 Bernstraße 22/24 – walkway through to the Moselle at Baroque building with hipped mansard roof, 1749
 Bernstraße 31 – three-floor solid building, from 1775 and 1896 (conversion)
 Branntweingässchen 2 – timber-frame house on quarrystone pedestal, 17th century
 Brückenstraße 3, Endertstraße 4 – Hotel "Alte Torschenke"; building with mansard roof with gables set slantwise, about 1910
 Burgfrieden 3 – former Electoral-Trier courthouse; two three-floor timber-frame houses, partly solid, latter half of the 17th century
 Burgfrieden 11 – brick building, 19th century; side towards the Moselle: four-floor quarrystone building with oriel, 19th or 20th century
 Burgfrieden 13/14 – side towards the street: timber-frame house in mixed building styles, plastered; side towards the Moselle: timber-frame house with balcony
 Burgfrieden 18 – three-floor Late Classicist house, earlier half of the 19th century
 Endertstraße 2 – "Alte Torschenke" ("Old Gateway Inn"); three-floor timber-frame house, partly solid, from 1626; hearth heating plates; Saint Roch, 17th or 18th century
 Endertstraße 7 – Late Historicist quarrystone building, Renaissance Revival, from 1899
 Endertstraße/Brückenstraße (monumental zone) – Kaiser-Wilhelm-Tunnel: bridge and teaching workshop used by the repair works; tunnel portal, sandstone, from 1877 and 1879; bridge: stone block building; teaching workshop: two-floor quarrystone pedestal and steel framework floor, about 1900
 Endertstraße 146 – Saint Anthony's Chapel (Kapelle St Anton); small aisleless church, partly timber-frame, half-hipped roof, 17th century
 Capuchin Monastery and Church (monumental zone) – church and sickroom, 1625–1628, church lengthened in 1692, aisleless church with lady's chapel, Baroque décor; monastery founded in 1623, cloister's east and north wings, about 1630, west wing 1692; guest building 1753; Way of the Cross to the town, 1758; attached old elementary school, about 1910
 Graveyard (monumental zone) – laid out towards the end of the 19th century, warriors' memorial 1864/1866/1870/1871 and warriors' memorial 1914/18, 1920s; graveyard cross from 1850; three metal crosses, 19th century; gravestones from the 19th century
 Heiligenhäuschen (a small, shrinelike structure consecrated to a saint or saints) – plastered building with three niches, 1710, endower's coat of arms from Archbishop Johann VIII Hugo von Orsbeck; wayside cross, 18th century
 Herrenstraße 24 – three-floor timber-frame house, partly solid, early 17th century
 Kelberger Straße (monumental zone) – Jewish graveyard in an enclosed area with a gate with a pointed arch, 64 grave steles from 1879 to the 1940s
 Hinter Kempen – chapel, 19th century
 Kelberger Straße 40 – Villa Schönblick; Late Historicist quarrystone building, hipped roof, late 19th century; prominent location above the town, opposite the castle
 Kirchgasse 4 – three-floor timber-frame house, partly solid, 18th century
 Klosterberg 3 – old elementary school, hipped roof, about 1910
 Löhrstraße 3 – three-floor timber-frame house, partly solid, from 1599, conversions beginning in the 18th century; in the quarrystone wall a grave cross, 18th century
 Löhrstraße 15 – three-floor timber-frame house, partly solid, about 1700 or from the 18th century; side house (no number) timber-frame house, partly solid
 Markt – town hall; building with mansard roof, after destruction in 1689 underwent reconstruction until 1739, completed by Philipp Honorius Ravensteyn
 Markt – fountain, basalt basin, from 1767, architect Nikolaus Lauxen
 Markt 4 – four-floor timber-frame building, partly solid, from 1610 and 1990
 Markt 5 – four-floor timber-frame house, partly solid, mansard roof, late 17th century
 Markt 6/7 – four-floor timber-frame building, partly solid, latter half of the 17th century
 Markt 9 – coat of arms, from 1699
 Markt 11 – three-floor timber-frame building, partly solid, plastered, from 1690
 Markt 15 – three-floor solid building, partly timber-frame, about 1690; in the back remnants of a solid building, 16th century, timber-frame parts newer
 Moselpromenade 1 – see Bernstraße 22/24
 Moselpromenade 9 – gateway arch, 14th century; see Town wall (monumental zone)
 Moselpromenade 11/12 – three-floor quarrystone building, crow-stepped gable, from 1654, expansion from 1894 or 1899
 Moselpromenade 18 – solid building with timber-frame gable, late 19th century, heavily altered by commercial modifications
 Moselpromenade 27 – two four-floor timber-frame houses, plastered, late 17th or early 18th century
 Moselpromenade 28 – Late Historicist hotel; three-floor quarrystone building, Renaissance Revival, from 1893
 Moselpromenade 37 – plastered building, partly timber-frame, early 20th century
 Moselpromenade 39 – see Burgfrieden 11
 Moselpromenade 40 – see Burgfrieden 13/14
 Moselpromenade 60 – Late Historicist winery, 1881–1882, building adviser R. A. Schmidt in collaboration with Julius Raschdorff; picturesque winemaker's villa, quarrystone, timber-frame commercial wing, garden; whole complex of buildings
 Moselpromenade/Burgfrieden (monumental zone) – group of buildings built before the 17th or 18th century along with a few less old buildings, about 1900
 Moselstraße 8 – quarrystone villa, about 1900
 Moselstraße 18 – villa; two-winged quarrystone building, partly timber-frame, early 20th century; sandstone sculpture
 Oberbachstraße 14 – "Zom Stüffje" inn; timber-frame building, partly solid, essentially from the 16th century, façade from the 18th century
 Oberbachstraße 17/19 – double timber-frame house, plastered, early 18th century
 Oberbachstraße 23 – three-floor timber-frame house, partly solid, late 17th or early 18th century; wooden sculpture, about 1700
 Oberbachstraße 25 – timber-frame house, partly solid, 18th century
 Oberbachstraße 46 – Evangelical church; Gothic Revival aisleless church, 1892–1893
 Behind Oberer Weg 9 – columbarium; three-floor tower, from 1898
 Obergasse 1 – three-floor house, timber-frame upper floor from 1839, essentially possibly older
 Obergasse 22 – sculpture of Saint Peter, 19th century
 Obergasse 24 – timber-frame house, partly solid, from 1704
 Pater-Martin-Straße 1 – Saint Martin's Catholic Parish Church (Pfarrkirche St. Martin); Late Gothic quire, between 1456 and 1503; quarrystone aisleless church, 1950–1951, architect Dominikus Böhm, Cologne; quarrystone tower with onion cupola, 1955–1963
 Pater-Martin-Straße 1 – three-floor building with mansard roof, about 1910
 Saint Roch's Plague Chapel (Pestkapelle St. Rochus); Baroque aisleless church, 1680; Late Gothic keystone, 15th century; cross fragments
 Town wall (monumental zone) – begun in 1332, reinforced in 1675; preserved: mediaeval Enderttor (gate), after 1352, with "Alter Torschänke" (1626); Kirchgasse town wall gate, 14th century; town wall at Capuchin monastery/graveyard with Balduinstor ("Baldwin's Gate") and further wall remnants; Martinstor ("Martin's Gate") or Mäuseturm ("Mice's Tower")
 Pinnerweg 10 – narrow gauge railway, 1879
 Ravenestraße 15 – Late Classicist plastered building, mid to late 19th century
 Ravenestraße 17 – so-called Landratsvilla (Landrat is the title given the head of a district council in Germany); Late Classicist plastered building, 1876
 Ravenestraße 32 – quarrystone building, from 1907
 Ravenestraße 38 – quarrystone building 1900
 Ravenestraße 39 – Amt court; building with half-hipped roof, crow-stepped gable risalto, 1891–1893, government building councillor NN
 Ravenestraße 41 – plastered building, partly timber-frame, early 20th century
 Ravenestraße 43 – three-floor plastered building, Renaissance Revival, about 1900-1910
 Schlaufstraße 5 – three-floor timber-frame house, partly solid, 17th century
 Schlaufstraße 7 – three-floor timber-frame house, partly solid, 18th century, expansion in 19th century
 Schloßstraße 11, 13 – former school, 18th/19th century; three-floor plastered building; pavilion, mid 19th century
 Weinbergshäuschen ("Little Vineyard House"); one-floor quarrystone building, mid 19th century
 Chapel; aisleless church, from 1892, Pietà, 18th or 19th century
 Way of the Cross to the Chapel at the Three Crosses; Bildstock type with sandstone reliefs, about 1900; chapel, quarrystone building, from 1856
 Löscher Hof – Lescherlinde (limetree), chapel and grave crosses; chapel, 19th century
 former Cochem Imperial castle, whole complex; begun possibly in the 10th century or about 1020, expanded in 1051 and in the earlier half of the 14th century, blown up in 1689, reconstructed in 1868 and between 1874 and 1877; Gothic Revival castle, mediaeval keep, inside from the earlier half of the 11th century, encased in the 14th century; garden pavilion, 19th century
 Ruin of the Winneburg (castle)
 Below Cochem castle in the woods – Jewish graveyard; seven gravestones, the oldest from 1836–1837

Cond
 Kapellenstraße/corner of Bergstraße – Chapel of the Fourteen Holy Helpers (Vierzehnnothelferkapelle); small quarrystone aisleless church, 19th century
 Pastor-Ziegler-Platz – Saint Remaclus's Old Catholic Church (Alte Katholische Kirche St. Remaklus); three-floor Romanesque tower, 12th century (?); within, a Christ figure as a warriors' memorial
 Stadionstraße – sandstone relief
 Stadionstraße 1 – Winemaker's villa; quarrystone building, partly timber-frame, from 1905
 Talstraße 9 – Gothic portal with coat of arms, from 1597
 Uferstraße/corner of Talstraße – grave cross fragment from 1653
 Uferstraße/corner of Breite Straße – Neoclassical garden pavilion, hipped roof, 1920s
 Valwiger Straße – Saint Remaclus's New Catholic Church (Neue Katholische Kirche St. Remaklus); quarrystone building, 1965–1968
 Valwiger Straße – wayside cross, from 1616
 Zehnthausstraße – winepress house; quarrystone building, partly timber-frame, 19th or 20th century
 Zehnthausstraße 18 – cadastral office; three-floor Expressionist plastered building, 1920s
 Zehnthausstraße 33 – timber-frame house, partly solid, plastered, essentially possibly from the 16th century
 Zehnthausstraße 56 – three-floor timber-frame house, partly solid, essentially from the 16th century
 Zehnthausstraße 73 – timber-frame house, partly solid, plastered, 18th century, no. 73 and 75, whole complex
 Zehnthausstraße 75 – timber-frame house, partly solid, plastered, mansard roof, 18th century, no. 73 and 75, whole complex
 Zehnthausstraße 77 – timber-frame house, partly solid, plastered, essentially from the 18th century
 Zehnthausstraße 83 – so-called Zehnthaus ("Tithe House"); former holding of the Stablo Monastery; timber-frame house, from 1615, outdoor staircase 1913
 Chapel with Stations of the Cross – quarrystone chapel, 19th century; Stations of the Cross, stele-type, from 1894
 Schuwerackerhof – chapel, within, Madonna, latter half of the 15th century; Saint Sebastian, earlier half of the 17th century; basalt wayside shrine (Bildstock), 1600, coat of arms
 Basalt wayside cross, from 1666

Sehl
 Alte Straße 14 – timber-frame house, partly solid, from 1686, knee wall and roof from the 19th century
 Alte Straße 18 – timber-frame house, partly solid, mansard roof, 18th century
 Brausestraße 8 – timber-frame house, partly solid, 17th century
 Ellerer Straße 18 – timber-frame façade, balloon frame, dendrochronologically dated to 1374
 Graveyard – two grave crosses, 1670, 17th century; warriors' memorial, sculptural group
 Josef-von-Lauff-Straße 38 – Villa Krain; timber-frame villa with several wings, partly solid, 1899–1900; whole complex with garden
 Saint Anthony's Chapel (Catholic; St.-Antonius-Kapelle); quire, latter half of the 15th century, aisleless church, 18th century
 Schulstraße – former school; quarrystone building, 1863
 Schulstraße 8 – abbot figure, 18th century (?)
 Sehler Anlagen 5 – quarrystone villa, about 1870
 On Bundesstraße 49, near Ebernach Monastery – wayside chapel with wayside cross, plastered building with wavy gable, 1676; niche cross, from 1629
 Near Ebernach Monastery – Weinbergshäuschen ("Little Vineyard House"); quarrystone building, partly timber-frame, 19th century
 Ebernach Monastery; former Benedictine monastery, mentioned in 1130; Catholic Chapel of the Assumption of Mary (Kapelle Mariae Himmelfahrt) – newer work includes Late Gothic quire, about 1437; outside: Crucifixion relief, 15th century; monastery: seven-axis building with mansard roof, from 1751, architect possibly Johannes Seiz; hospital: quarrystone building, from 1882; wayside chapel, quarrystone building, from 1904; whole complex with wayside chapel on Bundesstraße  49 (see there)

Other sightseeing
Other things worth seeing in Cochem include the Pinnerkreuz, a lookout point overlooking the town which can be reached by chairlift and the former Imperial castle (Reichsburg). There is also a promenade along the Moselle. Further points of interest are the historic Senfmühle ("Mustard Mill") and the water gauge house on the Moselle.

More detailed information about the castles and some of the ecclesiastical buildings mentioned above follows.

Cochem Imperial castle

The Reichsburg Cochem had its first documentary mention in 1130. In 1151, it was occupied by King Konrad III, who declared it an Imperial castle. In 1688, the castle was overrun by French King Louis XIV's troops in the course of the Nine Years' War (known in Germany as the Pfälzischer Erbfolgekrieg, or War of the Palatine Succession), and the following year, they destroyed it. The castle complex long lay in ruins before in 1868 it was bought by the Berlin businessman Louis Fréderic Jacques Ravené for 300 Goldmark and then reconstructed in the Gothic Revival style. Since 1978 it has been owned by the town of Cochem and is administered by a company named Reichsburg GmbH.

Winneburg castle ruin

The Winneburg was built in the latter half of the 13th century. It had its first documentary mention in 1304 as belonging to a one Wirich von Wunnenberg. In the centuries that followed, the castle complex was steadily expanded while all the while remaining within the ownership of the Lords of Wunnenberg (later Winneburg). After this noble family died out in 1637, the castle passed to the family Metternich. In 1689, during the Nine Years' War, the castle was besieged, taken and blown up by French troops. It was never restored, and remains in ruins to this day. It was, however, bought in 1832 by Prince von Metternich, but no reconstruction ever came about. Since 1932, it has been owned by the town of Cochem.

Saint Roch's Plague Chapel

The Pestkapelle St. Rochus, also known as the Peterskapelle seems to have had its groundwork laid in the time when Archbishop Otto von Ziegenhain waived Cochem's customary taxes and levies for ten years on the occasion of the Plague. It is described in an engraving by Braun and Hogenberg as S. Pettersberg. Standing next to a small, rectangular chapel was a hostel. It is also possible that the red sandstone keystone set above the west portal comes from this time. Despite heavy weathering, a high relief of a Madonna sitting on clouds, with Child, framed with a Zweipass, can be made out. In 1666, the Plague came once again to Cochem. This might well have been the reason why Philipp Emmerich von Winneburg and Dietrich Adolf von Metternich endowed a new building for the parish in 1680. With this new building, the Plague saint, Roch, came to the fore as the chapel's namesake. The wooden altar from 1682 shows the two men's coat of arms. A notice on the back names Michael Luter for a new setting in 1820. The central altar image is a glorification of Mary that sweeps over the representatives of the spiritual (pope, abbots, members of orders, priests) and worldly (emperors, kings, bishops) estates. Seen above her is the Holy Trinity with the Father, the Son and the Holy Ghost, and beside her are Death with the hourglass, and an angel with banners bearing doxologies and quotations from psalms. A cartouche above the central altar shows Saint "Anthony with Child". On the uppermost part of the altar, on an open gable, is Saint Peter with a key and a book. Originally, the chapel's ornamentation included images of Mary Magdalene, Saint Roch, Saint Sebastian, the holy bishop Nicholas and another statue of Roch. Saint Roch's dog was even depicted in the middle of the ceiling in a half-relief. Among the chapel's adornments was once a chandelier, which has since been stolen. It was a wall fixture in the shape of an arm dressed with a short sleeve.

Sehler Dom St. Antonius Abbas

In 1493, the parish of Cochem was granted leave to build a new chapel in Sehl on the bank of the Moselle. There had already been a chapel in Sehl, but its whereabouts are now unknown. Financing for the new chapel was made possible by Pope Alexander VI's and Archbishop of Trier Johann II of Baden's (1456–1503) indulgence privileges. Of this chapel, the quire still stands today, filled out by the west portal built in 1915. The chapel was consecrated for God's worship to the holy abbot and local resident Antonius, the holy bishop Wolfgang (depictions of whom are to be found used as keystones together with Archbishop Johann's coat of arms), the Madonna, the holy bishop Ruprecht and the holy virgin Cunen. Each Tuesday and Thursday, a Mass was to be said in the chapel by the Cochem pastor, for which the chapel would yearly receive 6 Gulden and 24 Weißpfennig in Cochem currency. For that, the hay from Sehl's meadows, bordering on the chapel, was pledged. Sehlers were "half-townsmen" of Cochem without their own municipal rights, and thus Cochem town council at first spoke out against the move to bring a bell to the so-called Sehler Dom ("Sehl Cathedral"). Nevertheless, the chapel later got one that was poured in 1441. It bears the inscription "AVE MARIA GRACIA PLENA DOMINUS TECUM MCCCCXXXXI" ("Hail Mary, full of grace – the Lord [is] with thee – 1441"). Found here today is a "Mary under the Cross" from the early 16th century, a gift from Dean Eckert to Saint Martin's.

Chapel at the Three Crosses

On an open spot between Cochem and Sehl in the traditional cadastral area known as Im Haag at some crags, the Kapelle Zu den drei Kreuzen ("Chapel at the Three Crosses") offers an impressive view into the Moselle valley. The building of the first chapel on this spot may well stem, like the Crucifixion group that stands before it, from an endowment made in 1652 in Elector of Trier Karl Casper von der Leyen's time. There is a corresponding year in soft sandstone mounted in the middle of the otherwise basalt cross. Two tau crosses, today lacking the former thief figures that once hung on them, still flank the middle cross. Carved into the left one are the master's initials, P.A. In the mid 19th century, the first chapel had fallen into such disrepair that then master builder Joseph Dalmar Senior's advice was sought. The chapel's condition, however, made any renovation impossible. So, Dalmar instead put forth a plan for a new building, along with a cost estimate. It was financed through donations from the Cochem townsfolk themselves. Besides the many small ones, there was also a big one of more than ten Thaler. To raise more monies to defray the building costs for the new chapel, a raffle was held. Offered as a prize was a pair of slippers, which was won by Captain Sabel. This raffle yielded a further ten Thaler, making it possible to complete the new chapel by 1850. Dalmar planned it to be built three metres farther back into the slope. The land needed for this was donated by the family Bauer. There were further expenses, such as those for roof boards and slates. The "Throne of Mercy" (Gnadenstuhl in German) from the 16th century that was originally found here now stands in the "Old Quire" at Saint Martin's.

Saint Remaclus's Parish Church

Anyone seeing Saint Remaclus's in the outlying centre of Cond for the first time might be surprised at how recently it was built (1964–1967). The plain, clear and also mighty shape, the slate quarrystones used in its building that are so typical of local construction and the way the church fits so well among its neighbours at the foot of the steep vineyards would lead many visitors to believe that its building date must lie quite far back in history.

According to the plan conceived by master churchbuilder Emil Steffann (1899–1968), the building was meant to serve as a bridgehead and a counterpoint to the castle over on the other side of the river. The execution of this work, which was simple yet marked by great quality, stands out quite strongly within the church. Saint Remaclus's stands as an exemplary conception in modern church building. It incorporates above all openness: for the liturgical implementation after the Second Vatican Council, and for the congregation around the altar. The cross-shaped space is surrounded by whitewashed brick walls, punctuated by great round windows. Mighty circular arches expand on the cross's three upper arms from the pews to the altar position before the deep-set apse. A huge wheel-shaped chandelier spreads over the pews and the chancel.

The ornamentation has been consciously reduced to a few very valuable, restored images and figures from the old, and now demolished, parish church, and to conservatively wrought artworks by contemporary artists: foundation stone and keystone in the crypt's barrel vaulting by Jochem Pechau, the tabernacle in the crypt by Klaus Balke, the forged grille by Paul Nagel, the lead glass window in the apse by Jakob Schwarzkopf and the ambo, the eternal flame and the altar candleholder by Christoph Anders. The church is opened at all service times.

Bundesbank-Bunker Cochem 

In 1962, Deutsche Bundesbank built a secret bunker in Cochem-Cond, 30 meters underground, disguised by two houses of the training and recreation center of Bundesbank. The bunker's vault held a reserve series of German mark banknotes totaling 15 billion marks during the Cold War, intended to enter circulation in case the Eastern Bloc would try to cripple West German economy by massively counterfeiting the existing DM banknotes. To open the vault, bank officials from Frankfurt would have to bring over three different keys and a lock combination.

Natural monuments

At Cochem, the Cochemer Krampen, a 24-kilometre-long stretch of the Moselle made up of many winding bows beginning upstream at Bremm, comes to an end.

Above the Imperial castle is found the Lescherlinde, a limetree which, owing to its great age of more than 550 years – it can even be clearly recognized up on the mountain from Cochem railway station – holds the status of Natural Monument.

Above the outlying centre of Cond lies the Brauselay Nature Conservation Area, which has Mediterranean vegetation. Not far from Cochem, down the Moselle from the village of Klotten, is found the Dortebachtal Nature Conservation Area, a place well worth a hike for its scenery.

Economy and infrastructure
The town of Cochem is characterized by winegrowing and tourism, even if their economic importance has been waning over the past few decades. Important tourism sites are the Reichsburg Cochem (Cochem Imperial castle), the Freizeitzentrum Cochem (leisure centre) in the outlying centre of Cond, the nearby Wild- und Freizeitpark Klotten ("Klotten Wilderness and Leisure Park") and the Ediger-Eller holiday and golf resort up in the Eifel heights. A majority of the inhabitants, though, can now be found employed in other branches of the economy. There are fewer than ten full-time winegrowing businesses.

Transport

Calling at the station are Regionalbahn, Regional-Express and InterCity trains, along with one ICE train each morning and evening affording a morning-evening link with Berlin. Moreover, there are a few regional buslines. The town belongs to the Verkehrsverbund Rhein-Mosel ("Rhine-Moselle Transport Association").

Public institutions
The town is a Bundeswehr location (TUK Cochem-Brauheck) and an administrative and educational centre. Cochem is the administrative seat of the Verbandsgemeinde of Cochem and the Cochem-Zell district. Located in Cochem are an Amt court, an employment office, a branch office of the Wasser- und Schifffahrtsamt Koblenz-Mosel ("Koblenz-Moselle Water and Ship Transport Office"), a health unit, the district waterworks, a police station and the water safety police station, a hospital, two seniors' residences, a home for those with mental handicaps (at Ebernach Monastery), a German Red Cross and Wasserwacht rescue station and a well equipped fire brigade.

Education

 Grundschule Cochem (primary school)
 Hauptschule Cochem
 Realschule Cochem
 Martin-von-Cochem-Gymnasium
 Berufsbildende Schule Cochem-Zell (vocational college)
 Berufsvorbereitungsjahr gewerblich-technischen sowie hauswirtschaftlichen Bereich (preparatory year in commercial-technical and budgetary fields)
 Berufsschule (professional school with 30 subject areas)
 Berufsfachschule I (BF I) (technical school I with 7 subject areas)
 Berufsfachschule II (BF II) (technical school II)
 Zweijährige Höhere Berufsfachschule (two-year higher technical school)
 Berufsoberschule I (BOS I) (upper professional school I)
 Duale Berufsoberschule (DBOS) (dual upper professional school)
 Berufsoberschule II (BOS II) (upper professional school II)
 Fachschule (school for geriatric nursing and tourism)
 Kreisvolkshochschule (KVHS) Cochem/Zell (district folk high school)

Clubs
 Aktive Cochemer Jugend (ACJ, youth)
 Brauhecker Boule Club (BBC, boules)
 Behindertensportgruppe Fortuna Ebernach (disabled sports)
 Caritasverband für die Region Mosel-Eifel-Hunsrück e. V., Cochem chapter (Caritas)
 Cochemer Bürgerwehr e. V. (vigilance committee)
 Cochemer Karnevalsgesellschaft 1849 e. V. (CKG, Carnival)
 Cochemer Rudergesellschaft 1905 e. V. (rowing)

Deutsche Lebens-Rettungs-Gesellschaft (DLRG), Cochem chapter
 Deutscher Amateur-Radio-Club (DARC), Cochem chapter
 Deutsches Rotes Kreuz (DRK), Cochem chapter (German Red Cross)
 Freiwillige Feuerwehr Cochem mit Jugendfeuerwehr Cochem (volunteer fire brigade with youth wing)
 Gastlichkeit & Tourismus e. V. (hospitality and tourism)
 Möhnenverein Cochem ("women fools", a Carnival/Shrovetide club)
 Musikverein Cochem e. V. (music)
 Reservistenkameradschaft Cochemer Land ("reservist comradeship")
 Schachclub Cochem 1973 e. V. (chess)
 Schützengesellschaft Cochem 1847 e. V. (shooting sports)
 Sehler Quetschefest Verein e. V. 
 Spielvereinigung Cochem 1912 e. V. (playing union)
 Technisches Hilfswerk (THW), Cochem chapter
 Tanzgruppe "Moselglück" (dancing)
 Turnverein Eintracht 1862 Cochem e. V. (gymnastics)
 Wasserwacht Cochem
 Winneburger Tross

Famous people
 von Cochem, knightly and Ministerial family, 1130–1353
 Emecho II von Cochem (1336–1401), abbot at Brauweiler
 Vinzenz Mohr (1475–1525), Benedictine priest, abbot at Trier
 Pater Martin of Cochem (1634–1712), priest in a religious order
 Conradus von Cochem (1650–1717), abbot at St. Pathaleon in Cologne
 Carl Joseph Friedrichs (1831–1916), printer, author and gold prospector
 Barbara Kemp (1881–1959), soprano and opera singer
 Maria Weinand (1882–1960), educator and writer
 Josef Steib (1898–1957), painter and etcher, died in Cochem
 Willi Werner Macke (1914–1985), chief mayor of Koblenz 1960–1972
 Carl-Fritz Nicolay (1922–1997), artist, died in Cochem
 Rudolf Steinberg (born 1943), legal scientist
 Horst Föhr (born 1944), business executive
 Werner Weidenfeld (born 1947), political scientist
 Ernst Heimes (born 1956), writer and cabaret artist
 Heike Raab (born 1965), politician
 Joy Vogelsang, actor Nicolas Cage's mother

Further images

Further reading
 Ralf Brachtendorf: Konflikte, Devianz, Kriminalität: Justiznutzung und Strafpraxis in Kurtrier im 18. Jahrhundert am Beispiel des Amts Cochem. Tectum-Verlag, Marburg 2003, S. 285.
 Ernst Heimes: Ich habe immer nur den Zaun gesehen. Suche nach dem KZ-Außenlager Cochem. 4. Auflage. Fölbach, Koblenz 1999, .
 Elmar Rettinger (Hrsg.): Historisches Ortslexikon Rheinland-Pfalz. Teil: 1. Ehemaliger Landkreis Cochem. Steiner, Stuttgart 1985, .
 Alfons Friderichs: Persönlichkeiten des Kreises Cochem-Zell. Trier, 2004,

References

External links

 Town's official webpage 
 Official webpage of tourism in Cochem area 
 Data from the Rhineland-Palatinate State Statistical Office 
 Official Website of the Reichsburg 
 Information about the Zeisig subcamp 
 Live cam Cochem
 Encyclopedia Judaica: Cochem, Germany

Cochem-Zell
Articles containing video clips